This is a list of films which have placed number one at the weekend box office in Ecuador during 2011.

References
 

2011 in Ecuador
2011
Ecuador